Younes El Aynaoui was the defending champion, but the Moroccan did not compete. Magnus Gustafsson won in the final 6–7(4–7), 6–3, 7–6(7–5), 6–1 against unseeded Raemon Sluiter and captured the fourteenth and last title of his professional career.

Seeds

Draw

Finals

Section 1

Section 2

Notes

External links
 Results

Singles